De Wieker Meule  is a smock mill in De Wijk, Netherlands. It was built in 1829 and has been restored to working order. The mill is listed as a Rijksmonument, number 39657.

History

De Wieker Meule was originally built in 1764 in De Leijen. In 1829, the mill was bought by Jacob Schiphorst Haalweide and moved to De Wijk. An extension was built against the base of the mill which housed two pairs of millstones driven by a diesel engine and later an electric motor. These were in addition to the two pairs of stones driven by the windmill. In 1926, the mill was bought by the Coöperative Landbouwbank. The ground floor was used at that time as a bank. In 1939, the sails of the mill were streamlined using the Dekker system. The mill cease to be used commercially in 1962. Restoration of the mill started in 1978, and was completed in 1980, with a new cap and sails. The Dekkerised sails were replaced with traditional Common sails. The Vereniging voor Vreemdelingenverkeer established an office in the base of the mill. In 1996, the mill was bought by the Stichting Wieker Meule (English: Wieker Mill Society).

Description

De Wieker Meule what the Dutch describe as an "achtkante stellingmolen" - a smock mill with a stage. It is a three-storey smock mill on a two-storey base. The smock and cap are thatched. The cap is winded by a tailpole and winch. The four Common sails, which span , are carried on a cast-iron windshaft, which was cast by millwright Enthoven in 1863. The windshaft carries a clasp arm brake wheel, which has 59 cogs. This drives the wallower (29 cogs) at the top of the upright shaft. At the bottom of the upright shaft the great spur wheel (105 cogs) drives two lantern pinion stone nuts, one having 34 staves and the other having 36 staves. These drive the two pairs of  diameter French Burr millstones.

Public access
De Wieker Meule is open to the public from 13:00 to 18:00 on Saturdays.

References

External links

 Website of the mill

Windmills in Drenthe
Smock mills in the Netherlands
Windmills completed in 1829
Rijksmonuments in Drenthe
Octagonal buildings in the Netherlands
De Wieker Meule, De Wijk